La Raza metro station is a Mexico City Metro transfer station in the Gustavo A. Madero borough of Mexico City. It is a combined underground and at-grade station with two side platforms each, served by Lines 3 (the Olive Line) and 5 (the Yellow Line). La Raza metro station is located between Potrero and Tlatelolco stations on Line 3, and between Autobuses del Norte and Misterios stations on Line 5.

La Raza metro station opened on 25 August 1978 with service on Line 3 southward toward Hospital General station. Southeasterly service on Line 5 toward Pantitlán station began on 1 July 1982. The station facilities are partially accessible for people with disabilities as there are braille signage plates; inside, there is an Internet café, a library, and a mural titled Monstruos de fin de milenio, painted by Ariosto Otero Reyes. Outside, there is a bicycle parking station and a bus terminal. Inside the tunnel, there is a permanent science exhibition called El Túnel de la Ciencia ("The Tunnel of Science"), installed by the National Autonomous University of Mexico (UNAM) to provide scientific information to passengers, which was opened on 30 November 1988. The exposition features information about science and astronomy using pictures.

In 2019, the station had an overall average daily ridership of 40,937 passengers. Since it was opened, La Raza metro station has had some incidents, including a shooting and a train crash, where one person died and 106 others resulted injured.

Location

La Raza is a metro transfer station in the Gustavo A. Madero borough, in northern Mexico City. The Line 3 station lies along Insurgentes Norte Avenue, while the Line 5 station lies along the intersection of Leoncavallo and Paganini Streets, near Eje Central Lázaro Cárdenas. Within the system, it lies between Potrero and Tlatelolco metro stations on Line 3; on Line 5, the station lies between Autobuses del Norte and Misterios metro stations.

In the future, it will connect with the Mexibús Line IV route.

Exits
There are five exits.
Northwest: Insurgentes Norte Avenue, Vallejo (Line 3).
Southwest: Insurgentes Norte Avenue, Vallejo (Line 3). 
West: Insurgentes Norte Avenue, Héroes de Nacozari (Line 3).
North: Leoncavallo Street and Paganini Street, Vallejo (Line 5).
South: Paganini Street, Vallejo (Line 5).

History and construction

Line 3 of the Mexico City Metro was built by Ingeniería de Sistemas de Transportes Metropolitano, Electrometro, and Cometro (a subsidiary of Empresas ICA); La Raza Line 3 opened on 25 August 1978, on the first day of the La Raza–Hospital General service.

Line 5 of the Mexico City Metro was built by Cometro; the station was opened on 1 July 1982, on the first day of the La Raza–Pantitlán service. The station was built at grade level.

The facilities are partially accessible for people with disabilities as there are braille signage plates, and there is an Internet café, a help desk, and a library.

In 2008, Metro authorities had maintenance work done on Line 5 station's roof.
In August 2016, the Government of Mexico City built a bicycle parking station outside La Raza station.

Incidents
On 28 September 1995, Ernesto Cruz Jiménez, a Huixquilucan police officer, entered a parked train and shot seven passengers, killing two of them. After being arrested, Cruz said he felt depressed. He was sentenced to 50 years in prison. After the incident, the Government of Mexico City had walk-through metal detectors installed in the metro system.

On 7 January 2023, at 09:16 CST (UTC−6), two trains crashed inside the La Raza–Potrero interstation tunnel killing one person and injuring 106 others. Both trains were going northbound towards Indios Verdes metro station. Service between Indios Verdes and Guerrero metro stations was suspended temporarily.

The station floods during periods of heavy rainfall.

Ridership
According to the data provided by the authorities since the 2000s, commuters have averaged per year between 17,200 and 37,900 daily entrances on Line 3 and between 6,000 and 12,900 daily entrances on Line 5 in the last decade.

In 2019, before the impact of the COVID-19 pandemic on public transport, the station's ridership totaled 14,942,281 passengers. For Line 3, the ridership was 11,364,171 passengers—31,134 passengers per day, which was a decrease of 397,769 passengers compared to 2018. For Line 5, the station had a ridership of 3,578,110—9,803 passengers per day, which was a decrease of 46,541 compared to 2018.

In 2019, the Line 3 station was the 38th busiest of the system's 195 stations, and the line's 6th busiest. The Line 5 station was the 155th busiest in the system and the line's 5th busiest.

Landmarks

El túnel de la ciencia
The El túnel de la ciencia Museum (English for "The Tunnel of Science") is the longest permanent exposition in the world. Science and astronomy pictures and information are mounted on the walls located inside the transfer tunnel. It was opened on 30 November 1988—the first Latin American scientific exhibition installed in a public transport location. Its purpose is to provide scientific information to passengers. It is aimed at young people since many of them are students at the National Autonomous University of Mexico (UNAM) and the National Polytechnic Institute (IPN). The exhibition was installed by Universum, UNAM's science museum. It is estimated that 60,000 people visit it with the guided tour service. In 2018, the  remodeled the tunnel.

Other exhibitions
On 25 November 2008, the Metro authorities installed the 1997 mural Monstruos de fin de milenio, which was painted and donated to the metro system by Mexican painter .

In June 2015, the Center for Research and Advanced Studies (CINVESTAV) of the IPN exhibited multiple human brains, their anatomy, and some injuries they had suffered. In April 2016, the  displayed rocks, fossils, minerals, and a shark jaw. In June 2016, the system featured an exhibition of 80 preserved human body parts by the Tominaga Nakamoto University, a display of 50 sculptures by Nour Kuri representing human bodies, and six photographs by Duilio Rodríguez representing pain. In May and June 2018, La Raza metro station hosted exhibitions by Manuel de la Cera, Norma Patiño, Teresa Olalde, and the Metropolitan Autonomous University (UAM)'s LibroFest.

From 21 August to 15 October 2018, the Secretariat of Agriculture and Rural Development (SAGARPA) and the National Commission for the Knowledge and Use of Biodiversity (CONABIO) displayed an exposition in the tunnel on bees and their ecological importance. In 2020, the station temporarily displayed pictures, landscapes, and sculptures created by Swiss artist H. R. Giger.

Gallery

Notes

References

External links 

 El túnel de la ciencia Official Website (in Spanish)
 

1978 establishments in Mexico
1982 establishments in Mexico
Accessible Mexico City Metro stations
Mexico City Metro Line 3 stations
Mexico City Metro Line 5 stations
Mexico City Metro stations in Gustavo A. Madero, Mexico City
Railway stations located underground in Mexico
Railway stations opened in 1978
Railway stations opened in 1982